, better known by her stage name  is a Japanese voice actress affiliated with 81 Produce. Yamada is a graduate of Tokyo University of Science.

Filmography

As Kyoko Yamada 
 Bikkuriman (Dossuke)
 Doraemon (Yamada-kun)
 Doraemon: Nobita's Genesis Diary (movie) (Emodoran, Suneko)
 Dragon Quest: The Adventure of Dai (Miina)
 Mahou Tsukai Sally 2 (Poppy)
 Ginga: Nagareboshi Gin (Mother) 
 Mobile Fighter G Gundam (Hoy)
 Sailor Moon R (Kirin (ep.67))
 Transformers Masterforce (Browning, Parrot)
 Ultraman USA (Andy)
 Ultraman Kids: 30 Million Light Years Looking for Mama
 Little Women II: Jo's Boys (Demi)
 Yawara! A Fashionable Judo Girl (Kurokawa)

As Fushigi Yamada 
 Asobou! Hello Kitty (Pekkle)
 Denji Sentai Megaranger vs. Carranger (Picoto)
 Kiteretsu Daihyakka (Mamekoro (2nd voice))
 Magic Knight Rayearth 2 (Child A (ep.40-41))
 Pocket Monsters Advanced Generation the Movie - Sky-Splitting Visitor: Deoxys (Masato)
 Pocket Monsters Advanced Generation the Movie - Wishing Star of the Seven Nights: Jirachi (Masato)
 Pocket Monsters: Advanced Generation (Masato)
 Pocket Monsters Advanced Generation the Movie - Pokémon Ranger and the Prince of the Sea: Manaphy (Masato)
 Pocket Monsters Advanced Generation the Movie - Mew and the Wave Hero: Lucario (Masato)
 Pokémon: The Mastermind of Mirage Pokémon (Masato)
 s-CRY-ed (Akira Terada)
 Saru Get You -On Air- (Piposaru, Pipotron Yellow)

References

External links 

1959 births
Living people
Voice actresses from Tokyo
81 Produce voice actors
Japanese voice actresses
Tokyo University of Science alumni